José Luis Santana Marin (born 29 September 1989) is a Mexican marathon runner.

He ran a personal best time of 2:10:54 to earn a silver medal at the 2019 Pan American Games.

In 2020 he took part in the World Athletics Half Marathon Championships, in Gdynia, finishing 29th in a time of 1:01.11.

On 30 April 2021, he was confirmed as part of the Mexican team for the delayed 2020 Summer Games in Tokyo.

References

External links
 

1989 births
Living people
Mexican male marathon runners
Mexican male long-distance runners
Pan American Games silver medalists for Mexico
Pan American Games medalists in athletics (track and field)
Athletes (track and field) at the 2019 Pan American Games
Medalists at the 2019 Pan American Games
Athletes (track and field) at the 2020 Summer Olympics
Olympic athletes of Mexico
21st-century Mexican people